Bandhalgoti is a clan of Rajputs found mainly in Amethi-Sultanpur region of Uttar Pradesh. Bandhalgoti is the most prominent clan among Kachhwaha. Bandhalgoti Rajputs ruled a number of  estates including Kohra, Amethi and Shahgarh etc. which lie in present-day Uttar Pradesh.

History 
Bandhalgoti sept of Rajputs, claiming descent from Raja Sodh Dev, a scion of the Kachhwaha(Suryavansi) dynasty of Jaipur, who is said to have migrated from Narwargarh, conquered the Bhars of Amethi, and built a fort at Raipur. The sixth in descent from him was Raja Mandhata Singh, who was childless; but with the aid of a saint's prayers a son was born to him, who was called Bandhu, in memory of the circumstances of his birth-whence the clan name of Bandhalgoti.

Notable people 
 
Babu Himmat Sah (Ruler of Kohra)
Babu Bhoop Singh (Leader of the Indian Rebellion of 1857 against the British)
Ravindra Pratap Singh (Former MP and Former MLA)
Sanjaya Sinh (Former MP and Former Cabinet Minister)
Rakesh Pratap Singh (MLA)
Deepak Singh (Former MLC)

See also 

Rajput clans

References 

Suryavansha
Rajput clans